The Hill family is a prominent family in Australian judo, having provided a number of National Judo Champions, competitors to the Olympic Games and Commonwealth Games, and Judo administrators.

Colin Hill

[[Colin Hill (judoka}|Colin Hill]] (1941 - ) was the President of the Judo Federation of Australia from 2010-2012, and Treasurer from 2006-2009. He is the father of Narelle, Steven, Jenny, Thomas, Matthew and Deborah. He has previously served as Manager of the Australian Judo Team at the 2000 Olympic Games in Sydney and the 2002 Commonwealth Games in Manchester. In 2015, he was awarded Life Membership of the JFA.

Narelle Hill

Narelle Hill (1969 - ) was a member of the Australian Judo Team at the 1996 Olympic Games in Atlanta. She won the Bronze medal in the Women's -66 kg division at the 1990 Commonwealth Games in Auckland. She has been Australian Champion five times.

Steven Hill

Steven Hill (1971 - ) was a member of the Australian Judo Team at the 2002 Commonwealth Games in Manchester. He was a Coach in the Australian Judo Team at the 2000 Olympic Games in Sydney. He has been Australian Champion five times.

Jenny Hill

Jenny Hill (1972 - ) was a member of the Australian Judo Team at the 2000 Olympic Games in Sydney.

Thomas Hill

Thomas Hill (1974 - ) was a member of the Australian Judo Team at the 2000 Olympic Games in Sydney, and was a Coach in the Australian Judo Team at the 2012 Olympic Games in London. He won the Gold medal in the Men's -73 kg division at the 2002 Commonwealth Games in Manchester. He has been Australian Champion nine times. Thomas also has 6 children who are also rising judo stars. Thomas and Steven have now opened their own judo gym, Hill Sports Academy which is in Belconnen in Canberra.

Matthew Hill

Matthew Hill (1976 - ) has been Australian Champion twice. He was also a member of the 1994 Australian Schoolboys rugby Team.

Deborah Hill

Deborah Hill (1978 - ) has been Australian Champion once.

References

 http://www.ausjudo.com.au/

 
Australian judoka
Hill family (Australia)